Fonsy Grethen (born 20 September 1960, in Luxembourg City) is a Luxembourgian carom billiards player. During his career, he won four world titles and thirteen European titles.

Notes

Luxembourgian carom billiards players
1960 births
Living people
Sportspeople from Luxembourg City
World champions in carom billiards